Récré A2 was a French children's TV programme broadcast in the 1970s and 1980s, on Antenne 2 (now France 2).

It was produced by Jacqueline Joubert and first aired on July 3, 1978, lasting until June 29, 1988.

Presenters and staff 
 Ariane
 Cabu
 Corbier
 Dorothée
 Jacky
 William Leymergie

Programs 
 Les Aventures électriques de Zeltron (1979 to 1982)
 Fabeltjeskrant
 Wattoo Wattoo Super Bird
 Yakari (1983 TV series)
 Pimpa
 Mimi Cracra (1986 TV series)
 Ulysse 31
 Maya the Honey Bee
 Les Quaz'e'amis
 Téléchat
 Judo Boy
 Les Paladins De France
 Télétactica
 Space Cobra
 Grendizer
 Candy Candy
 Space Pirate Captain Harlock
 The Rose of Versailles
 The Smurfs (1981 TV series)
 He-Man and the Masters of the Universe
 Spartakus and the Sun Beneath the Sea
 Chapi Chapo
 Arcadia of My Youth: Endless Orbit SSX
 Seabert
 Boule and Bill (1975)
 Casper the Friendly Ghost
 Thundercats
 Sherlock Hound
 Star Wars: Ewoks
 Mio Mao
 She-Ra: Princess of Power
 Groovie Goolies
 The Adventures of Tom Sawyer (1980 TV series)
 The Puppy's Further Adventures
 Mamemo
 George of the Jungle
 Pac-Man (TV series)
 Les Devinettes d'Epinal
 Acrobunch
 The Mysterious Cities of Gold
 Clémentine
 The Transformers (TV series)
 3-2-1 Contact
 The Little Rascals
 Barriers (TV series)
 Emily (TV series)
 Récré à ľopéra
 Dorotheé et la voiture rouge
 Heidi (1978 TV series)
 Dorotheé et le trésor des Caraïbes
 The Adventures of the Galaxy Rangers
 Treasure Island (1978 TV series)
 Jana of the Jungle
 Johan and Peewit
 Kum-Kum
 Around the World with Willy Fog
 Harold Lloyd's World of Comedy
 Mr. Merlin
 Méthanie
 Papivole
 The Mole (Krtek)
 Quick and Flupke
 Reksio
 The Secret of the Selenites
 Winsome Witch
 Dungeons & Dragons
 Tarzan, Lord of the Jungle
 Tchaou and Grodo
 The Fantastic Journey of Ty and Uan
 Dick Turpin
 Professor Popper's Problem
 Silas (TV series)
 Spectreman
 Message from Space: Galactic Wars
 Space Sheriff Gavan
 Die rote  Zora und ihre Bande (TV series)

See also 
 Les Musclés, a band from the following program called Club Dorothée

References 

 Les années Dorothée. Jacques Pessis, 2007

External links 
 Dorothée, Jacky and Corbier (1984) at INA

French children's television series
1978 French television series debuts
1988 French television series endings